Wheston is a civil parish in the Derbyshire Dales district of Derbyshire, England. The parish contains seven listed buildings that are recorded in the National Heritage List for England.  Of these, one is listed at Grade II*, the middle of the three grades, and the others are at Grade II, the lowest grade.  The parish contains the village of Wheston and the surrounding area.  All the listed buildings are in the village, and consist of farmhouses, farm buildings and the village cross.


Key

Buildings

References

Citations

Sources

 

Lists of listed buildings in Derbyshire